Birdie Wing: Golf Girls' Story (stylized as BIRDIE WING -Golf Girls' Story-) is a Japanese original anime television series about golf produced by Bandai Namco Pictures and directed by Takayuki Inagaki. The series aired from April to June 2022. A second season is set to premiere in April 2023.

Plot
In the European state of Nafrece, a girl named Eve uses her crude yet effective golfing style to act as a ringer and take money from various challengers in unsanctioned golf games, hoping to earn enough to secure a future for her adopted family and their bar. However, one day after beating another challenger, Eve meets with Japanese golfing prodigy Aoi Amawashi, who manages to defeat her in a 1-hole match. After suffering that defeat, Eve becomes obsessed with her newfound purpose of challenging Aoi to a full 18-hole match and beating her, while Aoi finds herself infatuated with Eve's attitude and determination. However, Eve is forced to battle through various challenges thrown in front of her by the Nafrece mafia, while Aoi's mother and her personal assistant try to get her to focus on her budding golf career.

Characters

A girl with a bullish golf style who makes money from underground golf games. Using her "Rainbow Bullet" and other golf styles, she easily defeats her opponents. Later on in the series, she enrolls in an all-girls school with a strong golf program, where Aoi and the others also attend.

Daughter of the Amawashi Group's CEO, she is a skilled golf player who is part of the golf club at Raiho Girls' Academy. It is said that her smile can grind her opponents to defeat.

She is the best friend of Aoi and her caddy. She has extensive knowledge, whether of psychology, statistics, or meteorology, along with detailed information on rivals and courses that Aoi will be participating in, so as to give her an upper edge.

She is the friend of Eve, living in the Nafres slums with her and her sister, Klein. She is energetic, cheerful, and goof-hearted. She is often the caddy of Eve during her underground golf games.

He is the golf club adviser at Raiho Girls' Academy. There are questions about who he really is.

He is Eve's golf trainer who left her after he had finished teaching her the golf skills she "needed".

The go-between for Eve and Klein to the Mafia underworld. She is also a skilled golfer.

A first-year student at Raiho Academy, with ambitions to become a professional caddy.

Team President of the Raiho Golf Team. Currently on the injured list with an elbow injury.

A Second-year Student at Nadanan Sports Academy and the Defending Japanese Amateur Champion.

A Second-year student at Nadanan Sports Academy and Mizuho Himekawa's Doubles partner.

A Third-year student at Shizuoka Girls' High School and their golf team's Captain.

A Second-year Student at Shizuoka High School and Kaoruko's Doubles Partner.

A famous golfer in the underground world who faces off against Eve when hired by Mafia boss Nicholas. She later becomes Eve's friend.

A first-year student at Raiho Academy who aspires to make the first team. She wants Ichina to caddy for her. 

CEO of the Amawashi Group and Athena Golf Brands. She is also Aoi's mother.

The sister of Lily and owner of the illegal shop where she, Eve, and Lily are living along with her three orphan immigrant children.

Production and release
The original anime series was announced on October 28, 2021. It was produced by Bandai Namco Pictures and directed by Takayuki Inagaki, with scripts written by Yōsuke Kuroda, and music composed by Kōtarō Nakagawa and Hironori Anazawa. The series aired from April 6 to June 29, 2022, on TV Tokyo and other networks.  Crunchyroll has licensed the series. Medialink licensed it in Southeast Asia and Oceania minus Australia and New Zealand; they streamed it on their Ani-One YouTube channel and Bilibili. On May 24, 2022, Bandai Namco teamed up with Jack Bunny!! to recreate and market the golf clothes used by Eve and Aoi in the ED sequence.

Following the conclusion of the series, a second season was announced to be in production. It was initially set to premiere in January 2023, but was later delayed to April 2023. The opening theme song for both seasons is "Venus Line" by Kohmi Hirose.

Episode list

Reception
The series was received positively. Briana Lawrence of The Mary Sue called the series "delightfully bonkers" and predicted future episodes would expand its "wacky, sapphic vibe". She later described the series as a "fantastically campy golf (love) story". Yuricon founder Erica Friedman argued that the series is similar to isekai like I'm in Love with the Villainess and argued it flouts the rules of the sports anime genre. She also called it a "delightful romp" with openly yuri themes and said it is close to becoming the "greatest Yuri sports anime of all time".

Alex Henderson of Anime Feminist, reviewing the first episode, criticized the series for its "questionable tropes" and tackling "touchy subjects with [fairly] wild abandon" but still argued it is entertaining and the most fun they "ever had watching golf". Vrai Kaiser of the same publication, reviewing the first four episodes, argued that the show's "extreme sports angle" wasn't as strong as it could be, and described the show as "flashy" and "weird" but said that the rivalry between Eve and Aoi gave the series "an unexpectedly solid core".

Reviewers for Anime News Network were more positive. They stated that they either loved the series, said it was cool with an "utterly ridiculous premise", were invested in seeing where the Aoi/Eve relationship went, described it as the best sports anime of the season, or otherwise praised the series. Nicholas Dupree and Steve Jones, writing for the same publication, said, in the This Week in Anime chatlog, that the series had a compelling angle when it came to the "rivalry/romance between Eve and Aoi" and praised the opening sequence.

Notes

References

External links
Official website 
 

Birdie Wing Metaverse 

2022 anime television series debuts
Anime with original screenplays
Bandai Namco Pictures
Crunchyroll anime
Golf in anime and manga
Organized crime in anime and manga
Television shows written by Yōsuke Kuroda
TV Tokyo original programming
Upcoming anime television series
Yuri (genre) anime and manga